The 2009 AFF U19 Youth Championship or AFF U.19 Kova Paint Cup 2009 was the sixth edition of the tournament organized by the ASEAN Football Federation and was hosted by Vietnam for the second time. The matches were played in Ho Chi Minh City from the 4th to the 12th of August 2009.  Vietnamese company Kova Paint have become the sponsors of the tournament.

Teams 

 were also planning to join this edition of the tournament, but their plans never came to fruition.

Tournament 
All times are Indochina Time (ICT) - UTC+7

Group stage 
Prior to withdrawals, the following was the original grouping of the teams.

Group A

Group B

Knockout stage

Bracket

Semi-finals

Third place play-off

Final

Winner

Goalscorers 

5 goals
  Thamil Arasu Ambumanee

3 goals
  Adisak Kraisorn
  Le Quoc Phuong
  Ha Minh Tuan

2 goals
  James Virgili
  Kliment Taseski
  Surachet Ngamtip
  Natthawut Khamrin
  Nguyễn Đình Bảo
  Nguyen Van Quyet

1 goal
  Dylan McGowan
  Jared Lum
  Mathew Leckie
  Eli Babalj
  Peter Franjic
  Daniel Bowles
  Joshua Groenewald
  Prak Mony Udom
  Mohd Fandi Othman
  Saiful Ridzuwan Selamat
  Mohd Fadhli Mohd Shas
  Wan Zack Haikal
  Kyaw Ko Ko

1 goal
  Khairul Nizam
  Syafiq Zainal
  Safuwan Baharudin
  Zulfahmi Arifin
  Sarach Yooyen
  José Carlos da Fonseca
  No
  Tran Tuan
  Nguyen Tan Tai

See also 
AFC U-19 Championship

References

External links 
ASEAN under-19 Championship 2009 at ASEANFootball.org

2009 in AFF football
2009 in Vietnamese football
2009
2009
2009 in youth association football